Nazareth College may refer to:

Australia
 Nazareth College (Australia), in Melbourne
 Nazareth Catholic College, Adelaide

Spain
Nazareth College, Alicante

United States
 Nazareth College (Kentucky), now Spalding University
 Nazareth College (Michigan)
 Nazareth College (New York)

See also
 Nazareth Academy (disambiguation)
 Collège Notre Dame de Nazareth, Beirut